The Hill Tinsley Medal is an annual award, conferred by the New Zealand Association of Scientists for "outstanding fundamental or applied research in the physical, natural or social sciences published by a scientist or scientists within 15 years of their PhD". The medal was first awarded in 1997. It is named for astronomer and cosmologist Beatrice Hill Tinsley. Prior to 2016, the medal was called the Research Medal.

Recipients

References

External links 
Hill Tinsley Medal, New Zealand Association of Scientists

New Zealand science and technology awards
Awards established in 1997